Faustino Harrison Usoz (21 May 1900, Chamangà, Flores Department – 20 August 1963, Montevideo)
was a Uruguayan political figure.

President of Uruguay 

He was President of the National Council of Uruguay from 1962 to 1963. His service as President came at a time when the collegiate system of Presidential rule then in force in Uruguay was coming under increasing scrutiny as a result of its perceived inadequacy in the face of mounting social and economic problems.

Political alignment 

Harrison was a member of the National Party (Uruguay), as was his predecessor and successor, Presidents Haedo and Crespo respectively. His period of office and the years surrounding it were somewhat exceptional in Uruguayan politics as they broke for a number of years the longstanding tradition of the rule of the Colorado Party.

Death 

He died in 1963, less than six months after stepping down from the Presidency.

See also 
 Politics of Uruguay

References

1900 births
1963 deaths
Presidents of the National Council of Government (Uruguay)
Intendants of Florida Department
People from Flores Department
Uruguayan notaries
National Party (Uruguay) politicians